Hay's Wharf may refer to:

Hay's Wharf, an enclosed dock building now known as Hay's Galleria   
Hay's Wharf Business Services, formerly part of Hays plc
Hay's Wharf Cartage Company, which owned the removal company Pickfords and travel agents Thomas Cook